1st Goodsal is the first, and to date only, studio album by Japanese idol group Ongaku Gatas. It was released by Zetima Records on February 6, 2008. The album peaked at #24 on the Oricon weekly charts, charting for two weeks.

Track listing

References

External links 
1st Goodsal entry at Up-Front Works Official Website

Zetima albums
2008 debut albums
Albums produced by Tsunku
Japanese-language albums
Ongaku Gatas albums